Peter Dubovský (7 May 1972 – 23 June 2000) was a Slovak professional footballer who played as a forward.

After starting his career with Slovan Bratislava he played seven years in Spain, amassing La Liga totals of 151 games and 19 goals for two teams.

Dubovský died in 2000 at 28, while on vacation in Thailand.

Club career
Born in Bratislava, Czechoslovakia, Dubovský made his professional debut with local ŠK Slovan Bratislava, for whom he signed at the age of 13. Only four years later he made his first Czechoslovak First League appearance, and went on to score 51 goals in only 59 appearances in his last two seasons combined (leading the scoring charts on both occasions), being an instrumental offensive figure as his hometown club won the national championship in 1992.

After being named the Slovak Footballer of the Year in 1993, Dubovský moved to Spain and signed for La Liga giants Real Madrid. He appeared in 26 games in his first season but was completely ostracized by new manager Jorge Valdano in his second and last, his options being further diminished at the club following the emergence of 17-year-old Raúl.

Dubovský remained in the country – and its top division – in the following five years, playing for Real Oviedo and scoring a career-best in Spain seven goals in 31 matches in the 1995–96 campaign, helping the Asturians to the 14th position.

International career
Dubovský made his debut for Czechoslovakia on 13 November 1991 at the age of 19, starting in a 2–1 away loss against Spain for the UEFA Euro 1992 qualifiers. He went on to appear in a further 13 internationals in the following two years, scoring six goals.

After the independence of Slovakia, Dubovský represented its national team, eventually becoming the country's record goalscorer at 12 (until it was broken by Szilárd Németh).

Death
On 23 June 2000, Dubovský was on vacation in Thailand with his fiancée, in the southern island resort of Ko Samui. While taking pictures of a waterfall, he tumbled and fell to his death, succumbing to "heavy loss of blood and severe brain injuries". He was 28 years old.

Career statistics

Scores and results list Czechoslovakia and Slovakia's goal tally first, score column indicates score after each Dubovský goal.

Honours
Slovan Bratislava
Czechoslovak First League: 1991–92

Real Madrid
La Liga: 1994–95
Supercopa de España: 1993

Individual
Slovak Footballer of the Year: 1993
Czechoslovak First League top scorer: 1991–92, 1992–93

References

External links

Czech Republic national team data 

Slovakfutball profile

1972 births
2000 deaths
Footballers from Bratislava
Czechoslovak footballers
Slovak footballers
Association football forwards
ŠK Slovan Bratislava players
La Liga players
Real Madrid CF players
Real Oviedo players
Czechoslovakia international footballers
Slovakia international footballers
Dual internationalists (football)
Slovak expatriate footballers
Expatriate footballers in Spain
Slovak expatriate sportspeople in Spain
Accidental deaths from falls
Accidental deaths in Thailand